Hymenobacter arcticus  is a Gram-negative, aerobic and rod-shaped bacterium from the genus of Hymenobacter which has been isolated from a glacial till sample near Ny-Ålesund in Norway.

References 

arcticus
Bacteria described in 2014